is an action role-playing video game developed by Compile and originally released for the Japanese MSX home computer system in 1987. Sega licensed the franchise in 1988 and released the game for the Master System (the Mark III in Japan), featuring enhanced graphics and entirely different overworld and dungeon layouts. This version was released worldwide under the name Golvellius: Valley of Doom.

Later that year (1988), Compile released yet another remake for the MSX2 system, titled . This game featured mostly the same graphics as the ones in the Sega Master System version, but the overworld and dungeon layouts are entirely different.

In 2009 it was announced by DotEmu/D4 Entreprise that Golvellius was to be re-released for the iPhone OS platform. It is a port of the Master System version.

The scenario is the same in all the three different versions of Golvellius. The ending promised a sequel, which was never developed/released. However, there is a spin-off game titled Super Cooks that came included in the 1989 release of the Disc Station Special Shoka Gou.

Reception
Computer and Video Games rated the Sega Master System version 87% in 1989. Console XS rated it 82% in 1992.

References

External links

1987 video games
Action role-playing video games
Compile (company) games
MSX games
MSX2 games
Master System games
IOS games
Video games developed in Japan